"Sister Susie's Sewing Shirts for Soldiers" is a World War I era song that tells about a young girl sewing shirts for soldiers fighting abroad. Her efforts are in vain however, as "Some soldiers send epistles, say they'd sooner sleep in thistles, than the saucy soft short shirts for soldiers sister Susie sews."

Herman Darewski composed the music, while the lyrics were written by R.P. Weston.  Both Billy Murray and Al Jolson sang early versions of the song, which was published by T. B. Harms & Francis and Day & Hunter in 1914. Each verse was meant to be sung faster than the last which presented issues for soldiers who had consumed large quantities of beer.

Lyrics

Sequels

Another tongue-twisting song from the Great War makes reference to "Sister Susie". Entitled "I Saw Six Short Soldiers Scrubbing Six Short Shirts" and composed by Herman Darewski, its lyrics are as follows:-

A recording of "I Saw Six Short Soldiers Scrubbing Six Short Shirts" by Jay Laurier appears on volume 2 of "Oh! It's A Lovely War - Songs & Sketches Of The Great War 1914-1918"

This rendering by Ewart Alan Mackintosh gets closer to the reality of war:

References

External links 
  Al Jolson Sings, "Sister Susie's Sewing Shirts for Soldiers"

Songs about soldiers
Songs about the military
1914 songs
Billy Murray (singer) songs
Al Jolson songs
Songs of World War I
Songs written by R. P. Weston